Santa Domenica Vittoria (Sicilian: Santa Dumìnica) is a town and comune in the Metropolitan City of Messina, Sicily, southern Italy.
Although the town is in the Metropolitan City of Messina it takes the telephone prefix for the Metropolitan City of Catania as it is on the border between the two entities.

The comune borders the following municipalities: Floresta, Montalbano Elicona, Randazzo, and Roccella Valdemone.

Santa Domenica Vittoria is named after a Calabrian saint, who was a victim of the Roman persecution of Christians under Diocletian.

Festival

The main folklore event in the town is the Feast of St. Anthony, the town's patron. The actual feast day is 17 January, but given the cold winters that are usually accompanied by heavy snow and below freezing conditions, it is celebrated on the first Sunday of September.

Before the day of celebrations there are seven days of prayer in the local church. On the day of the feast many of the men of the town dress in white and carry a statue of St Anthony in a procession through every street of town and the townspeople traditionally pin money to the statue as it passes by their balconies. The day ends with a  fireworks display and a party in the town's main piazza.

Gallery

External links
Municipal Website of Santa Domenica Vittoria 

Municipalities of the Metropolitan City of Messina